This is a family tree of the Thomson family. The Thomsons are Canada's wealthiest family, includes some of Canada's wealthiest individuals, and hold the titles Barons of Fleet in the Peerage of the United Kingdom.

List of notable members 
Chronological by birth:
 David Thomson (1760–1834)
 Roy Thomson (1894–1976)
 Kenneth Thomson (1923–2006)
 David Thomson (1957–Present)
 Peter Thomson (1965–Present)

References 

Thomson Reuters people
Thomson
Thomson